Trapped in the Body of a White Girl is a studio album by American comedian Julie Brown, released in 1987.

Brown independently re-released the CD in 2007 via her own pressing and available through her website. The rights to the album were sold in a larger deal to the Noble Rot label, which re-released it officially in 2010.

Though Brown is a comedian, not all of the songs are strictly comedic in nature.  The singles "I Like 'Em Big and Stupid", "Trapped in the Body of a White Girl" and "Girl Fight Tonight!" were released. "Homecoming Queen" was a B-side to "Stupid" and was far more successful and popular, but did not feature on a single of its own. Brown did not release another music recording until 2005.

Track listing
Side one
 "Trapped in the Body of a White Girl" – 3:58
 "I Like 'Em Big and Stupid" – 3:49
 "Shut Up and Kiss Me" – 3:08
 "Inside Every Girl" – 3:40
 "Time Slips Away" – 4:14 

Side two
"Callin' Your Heart" – 3:49 
 "Boys 'R a Drug" – 3:41
 "Girl Fight Tonight!" – 3:42 
 "Every Boy's Got One" – 3:25
 "The Homecoming Queen's Got a Gun" – 4:40

References

External links

1987 debut albums
Sire Records albums
Julie Brown albums